Kilimarathukavu Siva Parvathy Temple is a Hindu temple located in Kadakkal, Kollam, Kerala, India.  It contains the largest cult image of 'Dharma Sastha', an epithet of Ayyappan.

History

Kilimarathukavu Temple is an ancient temple, being thousands of years old. It is believed that the old temple was destroyed in the past and only the idols were left behind. In the 21st century a new temple was constructed. In 2011 the Travancore devasom board took control of the renovated temple with the help of the temple advisory committee.

Temple legend
During the Pandava's exile in the forest, Arjuna traveled an ascetic of Lord Shiva to seek Pashupatastra. One day during the journey, he came across a bird, which he began to follow. After several days it reached a valley, where it sat on a tree called "Kilimaram" near to a clean stream. Arjuna approached the bird. The bird plucked three leaves from the nearby "Koovalam" tree, and Arjuna felt like he was asked to do ascension for Lord Shiva. He commenced his ascension. 

Arjuna took bath in pond nearby and worshiped the Shiva Lingam stone he found there. As time went on, Arjuna's ascension became severe. As requested by Parvati, Shiva came to Arjuna as a wild man and Parvati as a wild woman. A monster, in the form of a pig, was sent by Duryodhana came to kill Arjuna. Arjuna and Shiva, in his disguise, shot the monster with arrows. They began to argue, and Arjuna beat the wild man with his bow. Parvati stopped him and revealed the wild man's true identity. Hearing this Arjuna did sashtanka namaskar and Shiva gifted him Pashupatastra and gave him blessings. Several other deitites, including Ganapathy, Murugan, Sastha, and Anjaneyan came upon the scene as well. Shiva told Arjuna "the place where we are now is very sacred and whoever came here for prayer should be blessed," and then disappeared. A Shivalingam appeared where he had stood.

Deities 
The temple has two Shiva deities: Shiva and Mahanadan. Other deities worshipped are Parvati, Murugan, Shastha, Hanuman, Ganapthi, Nagathara, and Navagraha.

In the main sreekovil there are images of Shiva and Parvati. 

The temple for Hanuman is situated in the middle of the temple pond.

The temple for Navagraha finished construction in 2021. Its elliptical shape is meant to invoke the Milky Way galaxy.

Festivals 
Maha Shivaratri on kumbham Malayalam calendar.

Navaratri on kanni Malayalam calendar.

Skandha Shashti on thulam Malayalam calendar.

Mandalapooja Makaravilakku on vrischikam Malayalam calendar.

Hanuman Jayanti on medam Malayalam calendar.

Pujas

Mathru Puja

Mathru puja is performed on Mother's Day to pay respects to mothers as representation of Devi. Mothers attend the temple with their children. The children do puja to their mother with milk, rose water and water, and chant mantras. At the end of the puja, the mothers bless their children and then give them sweets.

Aushadha Kanji 
Aushadha kanji occurs during the month of Karkidakam. For the entire month rice soup with Ayurvedic ingredients is prepared at the temple. Special pujas are done, and the soup is then distributed to the devotees. The soup is believed to be good for one's health and to help cure diseases.

Veda and yoga 

The temple holds weekly Veda classes and daily yoga classes.

See also
 Guruvayoorappan
 Kadakkal Devi Temple
 Kulathupuzha Sastha Temple
 Sabarimala
 Sri Padmanabhaswami Temple
 Hindu temples of Kerala

References

External links
Sathya Sai Veda Vahini - Inauguration of Veda Patana Kendram -Kadakkal, YouTube video at and showing the temple (not in English language)
Official site of Kilimarathukavu Temple

Hindu temples in Kollam district